Tommaso Fantacci (born 17 March 1997) is an Italian professional footballer who plays as a midfielder for  club Arzignano, on loan from Empoli.

Club career

Empoli

Loan to Padova 
On 27 July 2016, Fantacci was loaned to Serie C side Padova on a season-long loan deal. On 3 September he made his professional debut in Serie C for Padova as a substitute replacing Lius Maria Alfageme in the 79th minute of a 1–1 home draw against AlbinoLeffe. On 24 September, Fantacci played his first match as a starter for Padova, a 1–0 away win over Gubbio, he was replaced by Domenico Germitale in the 46th minute. Fantacci ended his season-long loan to Padova with only 5 appearances, only 1 as a starter, all in Serie C.

Loan to Prato 
On 18 August 2017, Fantacci was signed by Serie C club Prato on a season-long loan deal. On 27 August he made his debut for Prato as a substitute replacing Alberto Marini in the 51st minute of a 3–1 away defeat against Viterbese Castrense. On 3 September, Fantacci played his first match as a starter for Prato, a 1–1 home draw against Livorno, he was replaced by Matteo Cavagna in the 61st minute. On 4 October he played his first entire match for Prato, a 5–2 home defeat against Carrarese. On 5 November, Fantacci scored his first professional goal, as a substitute, in the 79th minute of a 4–1 home defeat against Piacenza. On 12 November he scored his second goal in the 60th minute of a 2–2 home draw against Arzachena. On 11 February 2018 he scored his third goal in the 3rd minute of a 2–2 home draw against Pisa. Fantacci ended his loan to Prato with 32 appearances, 5 goals and 2 assist, but Prato was relegated in Serie D.

Loan to Carpi and Pistoiese 
On 17 August 2018, Fantacci was loaned to Serie B club Carpi on a season-long loan deal. However his loan was terminated during the 2018–19 season winter break leaving Carpi with any appearances.

On 12 January 2019, Fantacci was loaned to Serie C side Pistoiese on a 6-month loan deal. Eight days later, on 20 January, he made his debut for Pistoiese in a 1–0 away defeat against Lucchese, he was replaced by Emmanuel Latte Lath after 68 minutes. Eight days later, on 28 January, he played his first entire match for the club, a 1–0 away win over Gozzano. On 25 February he received a red card in the 54th minute of a 2–0 home defeat against Robur Siena. Fantacci ended his loan to Pistoiese with 14 appearances, all as a starter, and 1 assist.

Return to Empoli
He made his Serie B debut for Empoli on 21 December 2019 in a game against Salernitana. He then started the next two games for Empoli, but did not appear during the rest of the season. Early in the 2020–21 Serie B season, he made one late-substitute appearance. He also appeared twice for Empoli in Coppa Italia in this period.

Loan to Juve Stabia
On 5 October 2020, he was loaned to Serie C club Juve Stabia.

Loan to Gubbio
On 11 August 2021, he moved on loan to Gubbio, again in Serie C.

Loans to Pontedera and Arzignano
On 2 July 2022, Fantacci joined Pontedera on loan. On 31 January 2023, he moved on a new loan to Arzignano.

International career 
Fantacci represented Italy at Under-15, Under-16, Under-17, Under-18 and Under-19 level. On 21 March 2012, Fantacci made his debut at U-15 level as a substitute replacing Federico Bonazzoli in the 70th minute of a 1–0 home win over Russia U-15. On 6 September 2012 he made his debut at U-16 level in a 3–1 away win over Switzerland U-16, he was replaced by Claudio Zappa in the 73rd minute. On 28 August 2013 he made his debut at U-17 level in a 3–2 away win over Turkey U-17, he was replaced by Nicolò Barella in the 64th minute. On 12 May 2015, Fantacci made his debut at U-18 level as a substitute replacing Giuseppe Panico in the 46th minute of a 2–0 home win over Iran U-18. On 12 August 2015, Fantacci made his debut at U-19 level in a 2–1 away win over Croatia U-18, he was replaced by Andrea Favilli in the 46th minute.

Career statistics

Club

References

External links
 

1997 births
Living people
Sportspeople from Lucca
Footballers from Tuscany
Italian footballers
Italy youth international footballers
Association football midfielders
Serie B players
Serie C players
Empoli F.C. players
Calcio Padova players
A.C. Prato players
A.C. Carpi players
U.S. Pistoiese 1921 players
S.S. Juve Stabia players
A.S. Gubbio 1910 players
U.S. Città di Pontedera players
F.C. Arzignano Valchiampo players